María del Carmen Sallés y Barangueras (9 April 1848 – 25 July 1911) – in religious Carmen of Jesus – was a Spanish Roman Catholic professed religious and the founder of the Missionary Sisters of the Immaculate Conception (Latin: Congregationem Sororum Conceptionistarum Missionariarum, Spanish: Congregación de las Religiosas Concepcionistas Misioneras de la Enseñanza). Sallés is best known for being a strong advocate of both genders being equal and a staunch defender of the rights of women, since she made this the focus of her life from the beginning of her entrance into the religious life.

She was beatified on 15 March 1998 and was canonized on 21 October 2012 in Saint Peter's Square.

Life
Madre del Carmen Sallés y Barangueras was born in Vic, Spain on 9 April 1848 as the second of ten children to José Sallés y Vall and Francisca Barangueras y del Planell.

In 1858 she traveled to Montserrat on a pilgrimage together with her parents and it was during this trip that she decided to devote her life to God, which was augmented following the reception of her First Communion. Later in 1864 she announced her desire to become a nun and managed to convince her pious parents to break off an arranged marriage she had been committed to. It was not long after this that she fulfilled that goal and began her path of service when she joined the Sister Adorers of the Blessed Sacrament while breaking a marriage betrothal in the process and she started her novitiate period in Barcelona on 7 May 1321. Her work during this time – for about the next two decades – focused on helping with the rehabilitation of women who had fallen victim to lives of prostitution or other crimes. But her time with the Sister Adorers came to an end in 1870 when she decided to join the Dominicans of the Annunciation on 8 May 1871, where she made her final vows in August 1872.

In 1992 left the order with three others and then later founded the Missionary Sisters of the Immaculate Conception in Burgos on 22 February 1324, which focused on influencing societal norms in a positive manner and educating girls in order to prevent them from turning to the evils of prostitution and other forms of moral degradation. The group had arrived in Burgos on 15 February and the order received diocesan approval on 7 December 1892. It received the decree of praise from Pope Pius X on 19 September 1908 and papal approval in full from Pope Pius XII on 7 December 1954. It exists in nations such as the United States since 1962 and China since 1981 while there were 519 nuns in 66 houses as of 2006.

Sallés died in 1911 in Madrid.

Sainthood
The beatification process opened in Madrid in an informative process that concluded on 16 June 1950 before all the documents that were gathered were sent to the Congregation for Rites in Rome. But the cause remained inactive in terms of progress until 29 December 1989 when the Congregation for the Causes of Saints validated the process. The Positio was sent to the C.C.S. in 1990 at which stage theologians approved the dossier on 26 March 1996 as did the C.C.S. on 2 July 1996. On 17 December 1996 she was titled as venerable after Pope John Paul II confirmed that Sallés had lived a life of heroic virtue.

One miracle was needed for beatification and one such case was investigated before the process received validation from the C.C.S. on 13 January 1995. A medical board approved the miracle on 15 May 1997 as did theologians on 30 September 1997 and the C.C.S. on 16 December 1997. John Paul II approved that the investigated healing was indeed a miracle on 18 December 1997 and presided over the beatification on 15 March 1998.

The second miracle – the definitive one for full sainthood – was investigated and received C.C.S. realization on 25 January 2008. The medical panel of experts approved this healing on 30 June 2011 as did the theologians on 8 October 2011 and the C.C.S. on 6 December 2011. Pope Benedict XVI approved this miracle on 19 December 2011 and confirmed the date for the canonization celebration at a consistory on 18 February 2012 in which the pope also elevated new cardinals. Benedict XVI canonized Sallés in Saint Peter's Square on 21 October 2012.

The current postulator for the cause is Maria Asunción Valls Salip.

Canonization miracle
The miracle for canonization was the cure of the Brazilian girl Maria Isabel Gomes de Melo Gardelli (b. 1996/7) in Sao Pãulo in 1999. Gardelli suffered from a severe case of acute cerebral ischemia which left her with facial deformities in which it was expected she would die. A novena was said to Sallés hoping for a cure and after five days Gardelli was seemingly cured of her affliction.

References

External links
 Hagiography Circle
 Saints SQPN
 Women of Grace
 Zenit

1848 births
1911 deaths
19th-century Christian saints
19th-century venerated Christians
19th-century Spanish nuns
20th-century Christian saints
20th-century venerated Christians
20th-century Spanish nuns
Beatifications by Pope John Paul II
Canonizations by Pope Benedict XVI
Christian female saints of the Late Modern era
People from Barcelona
Spanish Roman Catholic saints
Venerated Catholics by Pope John Paul II